Leaena Tambyah (born Leaena Chelliah; 28 June 1937) , is a special education advocate who founded Singapore's first school for children with multiple disabilities. The school was originally called the Handicapped Children's Playgroup, but went on to become the AWWA School. Tambyah also founded a programme called TEACH ME (Therapy and Educational Assistance for Children in Mainstream Education) to try to bring disabled children into mainstream schools, and to provide mobile therapy services to children whose families could not afford to bring them to a hospital.

Biography 
Leaena Chelliah was born in Penang, Malaya on 28 June 1937 to The Venerable Reverend Dr Devasahayam David Chelliah and his wife Rosalind. She was the youngest of the six children. She and her family moved from Penang to Singapore in 1940, when her father was appointed as headmaster of Saint Andrew's School. She attended Raffles Girls' School, then Raffles Institution, before moving to England to earn her bachelor's degree in social science at the University of Birmingham. She returned to Singapore in 1960, and the next year began working as an assistant director at the Ministry of Social Affairs.

Special education advocacy 
Tambyah left her job at the Ministry of Social Affairs when she became pregnant with the first of her children. She then worked part-time as a social worker and volunteered extensively. During this time she began volunteering at the Asian Women's Welfare Association (AWWA), where she helped run a family service centre.

In 1979, she organized the Handicapped Children's Playgroup, a weekly playgroup at the Church of St. Ignatius for a small number of children with multiple disabilities, who at the time were not accepted to mainstream or special needs schools. This was the first school for multiply-disabled children in Singapore. She chaired the playgroup from 1979 until 1985. In 1986, the playgroup won a United Nations Community Excellence Award. The playgroup has since become the AWWA School.

Tambyah organized a project called TEACH ME (Therapy and Educational Assistance for Children in Mainstream Education) in 1991. This project brought some children from special needs schools into mainstream schools. It also included a mobile therapy clinic to treat physically disabled children whose parents could not afford to bring them to hospitals for therapy. In 1994, the Family Resource and Training Centre gave TEACH ME the Innovative Programme Award.

In 1984, Tambyah was awarded the Public Service Medal for her work. In 1991, she earned a special volunteer award from the Community Chest of Singapore. In 1994, she received the Public Service Star, and was named Her World Woman of the Year for her work to help children with special needs. In 2011, she was given the Special Recognition Award at the President's Volunteerism & Philanthropy Awards.

Personal life
She first met Dr John Anantharajah Tambyah (1938–2011) in 1953 while she was attending Raffles Girls' School and he was attending Raffles Institution. They married in 1964, and had a son, Professor Paul Anantharajah Tambyah, and a daughter, Malini Tambyah.

Notable works
 Three Special Friends with Kathleen Chia - 2000
 D D Chelliah: Man of Faith, Master Teacher - 2007

References 

1937 births
People from Penang
Raffles Girls' Secondary School alumni
Raffles Institution alumni
Singaporean disability rights activists
Singaporean women activists
Recipients of the Pingat Bakti Masyarakat
Recipients of the Bintang Bakti Masyarakat
Living people
Alumni of the University of Birmingham
Singaporean expatriates in the United Kingdom
20th-century Singaporean educators
School founders
Women school principals and headteachers
Malaysian emigrants to Singapore
20th-century women educators